Eupodotis is a genus of bird in the bustard family Otididae. It contains the five species, all restricted to Africa. Species in the genera Afrotis and Lophotis are sometimes included in this genus; however some authorities separate the Karoo korhaan, Rüpell's Korhaan and little brown bustard as a separate genus Heterotetrax.

Species
 White-bellied bustard (Eupodotis senegalensis)
 Blue korhaan (Eupodotis caerulescens)
 Karoo korhaan (Eupodotis vigorsii)
 Rüppell's korhaan (Eupodotis rueppellii)
 Little brown bustard (Eupodotis humilis)

References 

 
Bird genera
Taxa named by René Lesson
Taxonomy articles created by Polbot